Tanjung Sugiarto (born 11 May 1999) is an Indonesian professional footballer who plays as a midfielder. He is the younger brother of Asep Berlian.

Club career

Madura United
In 2017, Sugiarto signed a year contract with Indonesian Liga 1 club Madura United. He made his professional debut on 4 May 2017 in a match against Persija Jakarta at the Patriot Candrabaga Stadium, Bekasi.

TIRA-Persikabo
He was signed for TIRA-Persikabo to play in Liga 1 in the 2019 season. Sugiarto made his debut on 2 August 2019 in a match against PSIS Semarang at the Moch. Soebroto Stadium, Magelang.

Mitra Kukar
He was signed for Mitra Kukar to play in Liga 2 in the 2020 season. This season was suspended on 27 March 2020 due to the COVID-19 pandemic. The season was abandoned and was declared void on 20 January 2021.

Muba Babel United
In 2021, Tanjung signed a contract with Indonesian Liga 2 club Muba Babel United. He made his league debut on 6 October against Sriwijaya at the Gelora Sriwijaya Stadium, Palembang.

Career statistics

Club

References

External links
 
 Tanjung Sugiarto at Liga Indonesia

1999 births
Living people
Indonesian Muslims
Indonesian footballers
Liga 1 (Indonesia) players
Liga 2 (Indonesia) players
Madura United F.C. players
PS TIRA players
Mitra Kukar players
Muba Babel United F.C. players
People from Bogor
Sportspeople from West Java
Association football midfielders